Sheep is the fourth EP by American post-grunge band Smile Empty Soul. It was announced on Facebook along with the album art teaser on August 24, 2019.
During the recording process a couple of studio pictures were teased on Facebook of studio recordings. The band then announced on October 5, 2019, on Facebook the completion of Sheep and the final track listing.

Lead singer Sean Danielsen hyped up the EP by playing snippets of songs on his car stereo over on his official Facebook page. 

On March 24, it was announced via Facebook that they would be printing a limited number of 200 copies on vinyl for purchase, hand signed by Danielsen and individually numbered.

Track listing

Personnel
 Sean Danielsen – lead vocals, lead guitar and bass guitar
 Ty Del Rose - Drums

References

External links

2019 EPs
Smile Empty Soul albums